Grace Gallatin Seton Thompson (28 January 1872 – 19 March 1959) was an American author and suffragist.

Early life and education 
Grace Gallatin was born in Sacramento, California on January 28, 1872. In 1888 she began writing articles for San Francisco newspapers under the pen name of Dorothy Dodge, and in 1892 graduated from Packer Collegiate Institute, in Brooklyn, NY.

Career

Writing 
In 1900, Seton published her first book, A Woman Tenderfoot, which described her trip on horseback through the Rocky Mountains. In 1907 she published the book Nimrod's Wife, a true hunting and travel book set in the Western United States. She later organized and directed a women's motor unit to aid soldiers in France during the first World War. During the 1920s and 1930s she visited China, Egypt, Hawaii, India, Indochina, Japan, and South America, and she wrote four books about her travels: A Woman Tenderfoot in Egypt (1923), Chinese Lanterns (1924), Yes, Lady Saheb (1925), and Poison Arrows (1938). She also wrote The Singing Traveler (1947), a collection of poems about mysticism and eastern religions.

Activism 

As a suffragist, she served as vice-president and later president of the Connecticut Woman Suffrage Association, from 1910 to 1920. She also worked for women's causes by serving as president of the National League of American Pen Women (1926-1928 and 1930-1932), during which time the number of branches of that organization doubled, and serving as chair of letters of the National Council of Women of the United States (1933-1938). As chair she established the Biblioteca Femina, a collection of volumes by women from all over the world, which was later donated to the Northwestern University Library. She also helped organize an international conference of women writers at the Century of Progress Exposition held in Chicago in 1933, and was a member of the International Council of Women, the Society of Woman Geographers, and the Women's National Republican Club. Seton also belonged to Pen and Brush. She served as president of Pen and Brush from 1898 to 1939.

Marriage
She was married to Ernest Thompson Seton, one of the founding pioneers of the Boy Scouts of America, and conflicts arose with the Boy Scouts about her suffrage activities and his British citizenship. The citizenship issue arose partly because of his high position within BSA, and because the federal charter James E. West was attempting to obtain for the BSA required its board members to be United States citizens. Ernest drafted his written resignation on January 29, 1915, but he did not send it to BSA until May.

Grace had married Ernest in 1896; she separated from him by the late 1920s, and they divorced in 1935. Her daughter Anya Seton, also an author, was born in 1904.

Death 
Seton died in Palm Beach, Florida on March 19, 1959.

Legacy 
Some of her papers are held in the Arthur and Elizabeth Schlesinger Library on the History of Women in America, and some are held at Smith College in the Sophia Smith Collection.

Works

Books 

 A Woman Tenderfoot (1900) Doubleday, Page and Co.
 Nimrod's Wife (1907) Doubleday, Page and Co.
 Chinese Lanterns (1924) New York: Dodd, Mead and Co. [published in London in 1924 by John Lane, Bodley Head]
 "Yes, Lady Saheb": A Woman's Adventurings with Mysterious India (1925) New York and London: Harper and Brothers
 Log of the "Look-See" A Half-Year in the Wilds of Matto Grosso and the Paraguayan Forest, Over the Andes to Peru (1932) London: Hurst & Blackett, Ltd.
 Magic Waters: Through the Wilds of Matto Grosso and Beyond (1933) New York: E.P. Dutton & Co, Inc.
 Poison Arrows: Strange Journey with an Opium Dealer: Annam, Cambodia, Siam and the Lotus Isle of Bali (1936) London: J. Gifford Ltd.
 Partial Survey of Women's Work in the Literary Field (1939) New York (with the National Council of Women of the United States and the International Council of Women)
 Biblioteca Femina (1939) (with Northwestern University Library, the National Council of Women of the United States, and the International Council of Women)
 The Singing Traveler (1947) Boston: The Christopher Publishing House

Books with Ernest Thompson Seton 

 The Trail of the Sandhill Stag (1899) New York: Charles Scribner's Sons
 The Biography of a Grizzly (1899) New York: Grosset & Dunlap
 Two Little Savages Being the Adventures of Two Boys Who Lived as Indians and What They Learned (1904) London: Archibald Constable & Co. Ltd.
 Animal Heroes (1905) New York: Grosset & Dunlap
 Woodmyth & Fable (1905) New York: The Century Co.
 The Biography of a Silver Fox, or, Domino Reynard of Goldur Town (1909) London: A. Constable
 Wild Animal Ways (1917) London and New York: Hodder and Stoughton
 The Biography of a Grizzly (1918) The Century Co.
 Wild Animals at Home (1926) London: Hodder and Stoughton
 The Trail of the Sandhill Stag (1929) New York: C. Scribner's Sons

Musical scores 

 "My Love Is a Blossom, Heigh O!" (1927) New York City: E. Morris Music Pub Co. (with Marianne Genet)
 "Lotus Blossom" (1927) New York City: E. Morris Music Pub Co. (with Marianne Genet)
 "A Canton Boat Woman" (1927) New York City: E. Morris Music Pub Co. (with Marianne Genet)
 "Lily of Arcadie" (1932) New York: H.W. Gray (with Marianne Genet)

References

Further reading
Notable American Women: The Modern Period (1980). Edited by Barbara Sicherman and Carol Hurd Green.

External links
Text of A Woman Tenderfoot, by Grace Gallatin Seton Thompson
Text of Nimrod's Wife, by Grace Gallatin Seton Thompson
Grace Gallatin Steon-Thompson papers at the Sophia Smith Collection, Smith College Special Collections

1872 births
1959 deaths
American travel writers
American women travel writers
American suffragists
American women in World War I
Members of the Society of Woman Geographers
20th-century American people
Ernest Thompson Seton